Unholy Passion is the first EP and second overall release by American deathrock band Samhain, Glenn Danzig's band after the disbanding of the Misfits. According to bassist Eerie Von in his photographic book Misery Obscura, the album was "a departure from our first release: more underground, more tribal. A step back further into the darkness". The song "All Hell" is a re-recorded version of the Misfits' "All Hell Breaks Loose".

The original 12" vinyl EP was pressed twice: once on black vinyl and the classic tan cover, and then again in 1986, on both red and black vinyl (with a maroon sleeve) and white vinyl (with tan cover).

In 1987, Danzig re-recorded the guitar and some vocal tracks for the songs, removing the original work done by Pete "Damien" Marshall. The recordings were given new mixes and, with the addition of "Misery Tomb", were released as part of Final Descent in 1990. The remixed versions were released as a standalone CD for the first time as part of the Samhain box set in 1999 and as an individual CD in 2000.

Track listing

Personnel 
 Glenn Danzig – vocals, guitar
 Eerie Von – bass
 Steve Zing – drums

References 

Samhain (band) albums
Albums produced by Glenn Danzig
1985 debut EPs
Plan 9 Records EPs
Horror punk EPs